This is a list of bridges and other crossings of the Willamette River in the U.S. state of Oregon from the Columbia River upstream to the confluence of the Middle Fork Willamette River and Coast Fork Willamette River.

Sauvie Island

Portland

Northern Willamette Valley

Middle Willamette Valley

Southern Willamette Valley

Former crossings

See also
 Course of the Willamette River
 List of bridges in Portland, Oregon
 List of crossings of the Columbia River
 Lists of Oregon-related topics

Notes

References

External links

 
Willamette River
Crossings